Symphony No. 6 in F major, K. 43, was composed by Wolfgang Amadeus Mozart in 1767. According to Alfred Einstein in his 1937 revision of the Köchel catalogue, the symphony was probably begun in Vienna and completed in Olomouc, a Moravian city to which the Mozart family fled to escape a Viennese smallpox epidemic; see Mozart and smallpox.

The symphony is in four movements. Its initial performance was at Brno on 30 December 1767 The autograph of the score is today preserved in the Biblioteka Jagiellońska in Kraków.

Movements and instrumentation
The instrumentation for the first performance was: 2 flutes; 2 oboes; 2 horns; bassoon; strings and continuo. The flutes are used in the second movement in place of the oboes.  For the first time in a symphony, Mozart uses two obligatory viola parts.

This is Mozart's first four-movement symphony, in which he introduces the Minuet and Trio for the first time, a feature common in many of his symphonies thereafter. The movements are:
Allegro, 
Andante, 
Menuetto and Trio, 
Allegro, 

The Andante movement uses a theme from Mozart's early Latin opera Apollo et Hyacinthus, K. 38, in which "muted violins sing over pizzicato seconds and divided violas, a ravishing effect".

First performance
The symphony was included in a concert arranged by Count von Schrattenbach, brother of the Archbishop of Salzburg, given by the Mozart family (Leopold Mozart, the 11-year-old Wolfgang Amadeus, and the 15-year-old Maria) on 30 December 1767 at the Taverna in Brno. A local clergyman recorded: "I attended a musical concert in a house in the city known as the "Taverna", at which a Salzburg boy of eleven years and his sister of fifteen years, accompanied on various instruments by inhabitants of Brno, excited everyone's admiration"

Notes and references

Sources
Brown, A. Peter: The Symphonic Repertoire (Volume 2). Indiana University Press, Bloomington and London 2002 .
 Giglberger, Veronika: (Preface), translated by J. Branford Robinson. Bärenreiter-Verlag, Kassel 2005 ISMN M-006-20466-3.
Kenyon, Nicholas: The Pegasus Pocket Guide to Mozart Pegasus Books, New York 2006 .
Zaslaw, Neal: Mozart's Symphonies:Context, Performance Practice, Reception OUP, Oxford 1991 .

External links

06
1767 compositions
Compositions in F major